{{DISPLAYTITLE:Omega2 Aquilae}}

Omega2 Aquilae, Latinized from ω2 Aquilae, is the Bayer designation for a star in the equatorial constellation of Aquila, the eagle. It has an apparent visual magnitude of 6.0, which is close to the lower limit of detectability with the naked eye. According to the Bortle Dark-Sky Scale, this star can be viewed from dark rural skies. The star is drifting closer to the Sun with a radial velocity of −26 km/s.

Analysis of the spectrum of this white-hued star shows it to match a stellar classification of A2 V, indicating it is an A-type main sequence star. It has about double the size and mass of the Sun. The star is radiating 22 times the luminosity of the Sun from its photosphere at an effective temperature of 8,936 K, giving it the white hue of an A-type star.

References

External links
 Image Omega-2 Aquilae
 HR 7332

A-type main-sequence stars
Aquila (constellation)
Aquilae, Omega2
BD+11 3802
Aquilae, 29
181383
095002
7332